Museum Siam is a discovery museum that is located at Sanam Chai road in Bangkok, Thailand. The museum was established in 2007 in the former building of the Ministry of Commerce. It was created to teach the national identity and history of the people of Thailand, and their relationships with neighboring cultures. The motto of the museum is “Play + Learn = เพลิน” (which means 'joyously' in Thai); through a series of interactive exhibits, the museum shows the development of Thailand from the past to present.

Architecture
The museum building was originally built as the offices of the Ministry of Commerce during the reign of King Vajiravudh (Rama VI, 1910–1925). The land previously belonged to a palace which served as the residence of several sons of King Rama III. The building, in the classical revival style, was designed by Italian architect Mario Tamagno, in collaboration with engineer E.G. Gollo and another architect named Guadrelli, and with decorative elements by Vittorio Novi. Construction took place from 1921 to 1922. The building received the ASA Architectural Conservation Award in 2006, and is a registered ancient monument.

The Sanam Chai MRT station, which opened in 2020, is located directly in front of the museum.

Exhibits
The museum's original permanent exhibit was titled Essays on Thailand. It explored history of Thailand through various aspects.

Each of the rooms of the museum contain a different theme such as 'Typically Thai', 'Bangkok', 'New Ayutthaya', 'Village Life', 'Change;, 'Politics and Communications', 'Thailand and the World', 'Thailand Today', Thailand Tomorrow', 'Introduction to Suvarnabhumi', 'Suvarnabhumi', 'Buddhism', 'Founding of Ayutthaya', 'Siam' and the 'War Room'. There is also a map room and an immersive theater with a long panoramic screen for watching movies about Thailand’s history. The museum also has temporary exhibits and learning activities.

The museum's second permanent exhibit, titled Decoding Thainess was launched in 2017, and seeks to deconstruct the meaning of Thainess. It is more oriented toward a youth and young-adult audience.

References

External links 
 Museum of Siam 

Museums in Bangkok
Phra Nakhon district
Registered ancient monuments in Bangkok